Barley Sheaf Inn is a historic inn and tavern located at East Norriton Township, Montgomery County, Pennsylvania.  It is a 2 1/2-story, plastered stone building, 60 feet wide and 46 feet deep, with a frame rear addition.  Also on the property are a contributing barn and wagon shed.  From 1784 to about 1787, it housed the first Montgomery  County courthouse.  It housed an inn and tavern until 1861, after which it was a private residence.  In 1980, it housed professional offices.

It was added to the National Register of Historic Places December 10, 1980.

See also
 Contributing property
 Cultural landscape
 Property type (National Register of Historic Places)
 State Historic Preservation Office

References

External links

National Register of Historic Places

Buildings and structures in Montgomery County, Pennsylvania
Commercial buildings completed in 1784
History of Montgomery County, Pennsylvania
Hotel buildings on the National Register of Historic Places in Pennsylvania
National Register of Historic Places in Montgomery County, Pennsylvania